Metin-Ali-Feyyaz  (also called Metin Ali Feyyaz, shortly MAF) is a combination of the first names of three Turkish footballers: Metin Tekin, Ali Gültiken, and Feyyaz Uçar, who served Turkish club Beşiktaş, during one of the most successful periods of the team, mostly notably under English manager Gordon Milne's spell in late 1980s and early 1990s.

MAF years

The three had been recruited in relatively young ages as Tekin and Gültiken joined the squad as youth players. Tekin and Uçar were promoted to the professional team during the 1982–83 season. They were joined by Gültiken in the beginning of 1984–85 season. Tekin and Gültiken played together during the pre-season TSYD Cup for the first time. In the opening match of the season, all three footballers played for some minutes; however, they were not on the pitch at the same time. On 23 March 1984, the trio played together for the very first time after Tekin was joined by Uçar in the 67th minute and Gültiken in the 79th minute. On 5 January 1986, the three were in the starting squad for the first time. Beşiktaş managed to beat Trabzonspor with Metin Tekin's goal in that match. Later that season, the trio became permanent players in the starting eleven of the team.

The trio had achieved numerous glories, and various notable scores in domestic competitions. They contributed the only three-in-a-row title achieving term of club history in 1989–90, 1990–91 and 1991–92 seasons. Most notably, Beşiktaş became the first and to this day only undefeated champion in Turkish League history.

The three had taken a part in the squad of historical match against Adana Demirspor, ended 10–0 in favour of Beşiktaş, as the highest margin ever scored in Turkish First League history, on 15 October 1989. They scored all the goals, in which Gültiken put 4, Tekin and Uçar put 3 goals away. Started on Week 26 of 1990–91 season, the unbeaten record of the team lasted for 48 straight matches, until Week 13 of 1992–93 season.

The last competitive match where Metin, Ali, and Feyyaz played together was the league match against Zeytinburnuspor on 6 March 1994. In that match, Ali Gültiken came as a substitute in the 60th minute. The trio disbanded when Feyyaz Uçar was transferred to Fenerbahçe SK at the end of 1993–94 season.

During a post-retirement interview, Tekin expressed that he was first a Galatasaray supporter in his childhood, influenced by his father, however; he later changed his preference for Beşiktaş.

Statistics

Honours

Club
 European Champion Clubs' Cup
 Quarter Finalists: 1 (1986–87)
Süper Lig
 Champions: 5 (1985–86, 1989–90, 1990–91, 1991–92, 1994–95)
 Turkish Cup
 Champions: 3 (1988–89, 1989–90, 1993–94)
 Presidential Cup
 Champions: 4 (1985–86, 1988–89, 1991–92, 1993–94)
 Chancellor Cup
 Champions: 2 (1987–88, 1996–97)
 TSYD Cup
 Champions: 7 (1984, 1985, 1988, 1990, 1991, 1994, 1997)

Second On

 Süper Lig 
 Second: 6 1985, 1987, 1988, 1989, 1993, 1997
 Turkish Cup 
 Second: 2 1984, 1993
 Turkish Super Cup 
 Second: 5 1982, 1990, 1991, 1993, 1995
 Chancellor Cup 
 Second: 2 1987, 1996

Individual
 Ali Gültiken
 European Golden Shoe
 Top Scorer - 6th Place: 1 (1987–88), 30 goals
 Turkish League
 Top Scorer - 2nd Place: 1 (1987–88), 30 goals
 Feyyaz Uçar
 Turkish League
 Top Scorer: 1 (1989–90), 28 goals

Chants
The trio inspired the fans to compose various chants in MAF theme. Two of notable chats:

References

External links
 Profiles at BJK official site
 Metin Tekin
 Ali Gültiken
 Feyyaz Uçar

Beşiktaş Football
Nicknamed groups of association football players